Khuramsha is a rural locality (a selo) in Ivolginsky District, Republic of Buryatia, Russia. The population was 996 as of 2010. There are 15 streets.

Geography 
Khuramsha is located 35 km southwest of Ivolginsk (the district's administrative centre) by road. Kokorino is the nearest rural locality.

References 

Rural localities in Ivolginsky District